Evdokiya Ivanova Maneva-Babulkova (born 20 March 1945) is a Bulgarian politician who served as Minister of Environment in the Kostov government between 1997 and 2001.

Life

Maneva was born in Sofia and completed studies in chemical engineering in the Soviet Union. She obtained a doctorate in economics in Moscow in 1983.

Between February and May 1997, Maneva served as vice-Prime Minister in the caretaker government of Stefan Sofiyanski before becoming a member of the Kostov cabinet. In 2001 she was temporarily the leader of the Sofia branch of the UDF.

In March 2013, she became the vice-Minister of the Environment in the interim Raykov government.

Maneva was also among the candidates considered for the Bliznashki government that was appointed by Rosen Plevneliev in the aftermath of Plamen Oresharski's resignation as Prime Minister.

References 

1945 births
Living people
Politicians from Sofia
Government ministers of Bulgaria
20th-century Bulgarian women politicians
20th-century Bulgarian politicians
Environment ministers
Women government ministers of Bulgaria
21st-century Bulgarian women politicians
21st-century Bulgarian politicians